Released on May 9, 2006, The Big Picture is the third full-length album, and fourth Disc by Canadian punk rock band The Salads. It was released in 2006, on Maui Wowie Records, and distributed by Warner Music Canada.

It was recorded over the course of 2005 and 2006 in London, Ontario at EMAC Studios, and features the singles Growing Up and A Better Way.
The videos for Growing Up and Better Way, both in rotation on Muchloud can be found on YouTube.

Track listing
 Growing Up (3:19)
 Individual (3:26)
 It's Alright (3:23)
 A Better Way (2:55)
 Seasons (3:15)
 Got No Love (2:56)
 Powerless (3:42)
 Circles (4:02)
 The First Time (8:28 With Thank yous)
 Thick & Thin (3:02)

Album credits
Chuck Dailey: Bass, Backing Vocals, lyrics
Mista D: Vocals, lyrics
Dave Ziemba: Guitar
Grant Taylor: Drums, Backing Vocals

2006 albums
The Salads albums